Dezső Keresztury (6 September 1904 – 30 April 1996) was a Hungarian poet and politician, who served as Minister of Religion and Education between 1945 and 1947. He became a member of the Hungarian Academy of Sciences in 1982.

References
 Magyar Életrajzi Lexikon

1904 births
1996 deaths
People from Zalaegerszeg
National Peasant Party (Hungary) politicians
Education ministers of Hungary
Herder Prize recipients